Maksari is a rural locality (a khutor) in Perelazovskoye Rural Settlement, Kletsky District, Volgograd Oblast, Russia. The population was 190 as of 2010. There are 4 streets.

Geography 
Maksari is located in steppe, on the Krepkaya River, 46 km southwest of Kletskaya (the district's administrative centre) by road. Perelazovsky is the nearest rural locality.

References 

Rural localities in Kletsky District